PTV Training Academy or Pakistan Television Academy is a public television institution and a professional training institute based in Islamabad, Pakistan. It was established in 1988 by the Government of Pakistan. The institute is currently working under the control of Pakistan Television Corporation and Ministry of Information and Broadcasting.

In September 2018, Fawad Chaudhry, Minister of Information and Broadcasting announced that the federal government would establish a state-of-the-art media university in Islamabad. It also had plans to merge Pakistan Television Academy and Radio Pakistan Academy.

PTV Academy trains its own personnel. It also has cooperation agreements with agencies abroad.

References

External links 
 PTV Academy homepage

Pakistan Television Corporation
Educational institutions established in 1988
Universities and colleges in Islamabad
Art schools in Pakistan
Academic institutions in Pakistan
Learned societies of Pakistan
Pakistan federal departments and agencies
1988 establishments in Pakistan